For information on all Lamar University sports, see Lamar Cardinals and Lady Cardinals

The 1980–81 Lamar Cardinals basketball team represented Lamar University during the 1980–81 NCAA Division I men's basketball season. The Cardinals were led by first-year head coach Pat Foster and played their home games at McDonald Gym in Beaumont, Texas as members of the Southland Conference.  The Cardinals won the regular season conference championship and the 1981 Southland Conference men's basketball tournament.  They received an automatic invitation to the 1981 NCAA Division I men's basketball tournament where they defeated the Missouri Tigers in the first game and lost to LSU in the second game. Lamar finished the season with a record of 25–5.  The Cardinals were ranked in the AP Poll for one week at number 19.

Roster 
Sources:

Schedule and results
Sources:

|-
!colspan=12 style=| Non-conference regular season

|-
!colspan=12 style=| Southland Conference regular season

|-
!colspan=12 style=| Southland tournament

|-
!colspan=12 style=| NCAA Division I men's basketball tournament

References

Lamar Cardinals basketball seasons
Lamar
Lamar
Lamar Cardinals basketball
Lamar Cardinals basketball